Seyidli may refer to:
Seyidli, Agdam, Azerbaijan
Seyidli, Khachmaz, a village in Nabran municipality, Azerbaijan